Chirolophis is a genus of marine ray-finned fishes belonging to the family Stichaeidae, the pricklebacks and shannies.

The species of this genus are found in Northern Pacific Ocean and Northern Atlantic Ocean.

Species
The following species are classified within the genus Chirolophis:

References

Chirolophinae
 
Taxa described in 1839